The Capture of Roxburgh was a siege that took place in 1314, which was a major conflict in the First War of Scottish Independence. This siege was a prelude to the Battle of Bannockburn.

Background
Sir James Douglas, Lord of Douglas, after his victory over the Clan MacDougall, had been capturing several castles back from the English, but the mere thought of taking Roxburgh Castle was one that daunted him.

Siege
Roxburgh Castle was on impregnable ground, and was guarded well. Douglas and Walter Stewart, 6th High Steward of Scotland, disguised their few men as cows, so the garrison was unaware of their presence. They then used ladders to climb to the top and took the castle by total surprise. They inflicted heavy casualties on the garrison, including wounding their leader in the face with an arrow.

Aftermath
The Lanercost Chronicle records that "all that beautiful castle the Scots pulled down to the ground, like the other castles that they had succeeded in capturing, lest the English should ever again rule the land by holding the castles."

References

1314 in Scotland
Battles of the Wars of Scottish Independence
Castles in the Scottish Borders
Conflicts in 1314
Roxburgh
Sieges involving England
Sieges involving Scotland